is a Japanese actor and singer. A fan of tokusatsu, Tokuyama has had a role in several series, most notably Sou Yaguruma/Kamen Rider TheBee/Kamen Rider KickHopper in Kamen Rider Kabuto and Hiroto Sutō/Go-on Gold in Engine Sentai Go-onger.

Biography
Born  in Suginami-ku, Japan, he has one younger brother and one older sister. His parents run a ramen restaurant. Since childhood he acted in several movies and dramas. He studied in Horikoshi High School before he joined the JVC Entertainment agency and left in 2008 March. Now, he has joined M2 Music and is the vocalist of the band "eroica". In 1999, he debuted as a singer with "Afureru Omoi" which was produced by Kenichi Kurosawa. His most famous singles are the two opening songs of Gensoumaden Saiyuuki.

Filmography

Drama and series
Yashiro Shougun Yoshimune (1995, NHK), Tayasu Munetake
Keiji ou! (1996)
B-Fighter Kabuto (1996, TV Asahi), Eiji (10 episodes)
Bokura no Yuuki Miman-toshi (1997,October – December, NTV), Ryu
Bishoujo H (1998, Fuji TV), (10 episodes)
Seikimatsu no uta (1998, NTV), Manaka Tooru (6 episodes)
Great Teacher Onizuka (TV drama) (1998, July–September, Fuji TV), Yoda Kenji
Joshi kousei mitsu-yu no nazo! (1998), (2 episodes)
Prison Hotel (1999, April – June, Asahi TV), Hanazawa Shigeru
Great Teacher Onizuka drama special (1999)
Sekai no Meisaku douwa (1999), Yuuki wo dashite, xmas tree, Hanatsumi jiisan
Hatachi no Kekkon (2000, TBS), Kashiwagi Shigeki (7 episodes)
19 - Nineteen Hiroshimahasu Musician Tanjyou monogatari (2000, February, RCC)
Kyoushi binbin monogatari special: ano nekketsu saikyou comb (2000)
Mápó dòufu no nyoubou (2003, May, NHK), Lee
Yankee bokou ni kaeru (2003, October – December, TBS), Kume Takaaki
Holyland (2005, April – June, TBS), Izawa Masaki
Friday Entertaintment Chousa kenji – Tigusa Taisuke no jiken file, aka no kumikyoku (2005, November, fuji TV)
Kamen Rider Kabuto (2006, January – 2007, January, Asahi TV), Sou Yaguruma aka Kamen Rider TheBee/Kamen Rider KickHopper
Ultraman Max (2006, TBS), Cameo, episode 36
Friday Entertaintment Natsuki Shizuko Suspense – Hinata Yumeko tyoutei i-in jikenpou4 fukushuu (2006, June, fuji TV)
Saturday midnight drama (Kaikan Shokunin) (2006, August, 26th, fuji TV), (6 episodes)
Saturday Premium (Shin-oishinbo) (2007, January, 20th, fuji TV), Okaboshi Ryouzou
Kamen Rider Den-O No. 27 (2007, August, 5th, Asahi TV), Molech Imagin (Voice)
Nekketsu Nise-kazoku (2007, TBS), Asakura Kazuma
Tokyo Prom Queen (2008, YouTube, Mixi, SmileVideo), Mashima Shinji
Engine Sentai Go-onger (2008, TV Asahi), Hiroto Sutō/Go-On Gold
Kamen Rider Decade (2009, Asahi TV), Kamen Rider KickHopper (Voice)
Smile (2009, TBS), Kawai Kinta
Kosodate Play＆MORE (2009, MBS), Hikaru Nanase
Indigo no Yoru (2010, THK), Kuuya
Arienai (2010, THK), Shinji Yonekura, episode 7 
Keishichō shissōninsōsaka (2010, Asahi TV), Tomoya Tachibana, episode 4
Sakura shinjū (2011, THK), Takanashi Hirohito/ Takuma Doichi
Hanazakari no Kimitachi e (2011, fuji TV), Oscar M. Himejima / Himejima Masao
Kaito handsome (2011, THK), Date Kimihiko
HUNTER ~Sono Onnatachi, Shoukin Kasegi (2011, Kansai TV), Shuji Mochida, episode 6
Sengoku Basara-MOONLIGHT PARTY (2012, MBS), Kojuro Katakura
Koko Nyushi (2012, fuji TV), Toshiya Konishi 
Doku Poison (2012, THK), Kengo Osugi 
Otasukeya Jinpachi (2013, THK), Ikki Amamiya 
Sennyu Tantei Tokage (2013, TBS), Seiya Sone
Yamada-kun to Nananin no Majo (2013, Fuji TV), Yamazaki Haruma
Ao no Umi: Long Summer (2014, Tokai TV), Kota Aragaki (aged 32)
Kamen Rider Zi-O (2019, Asahi TV), Sou Yaguruma/Kamen Rider KickHopper/Another Kabuto

Stage Musical
 Count-down 10 (2000–2006, July Kayou pops channel）

Films
Pyrokinesis (2000, Toho co.), Ogura Masaki
Oshikiri (2000)
Keizoku (2000, Toho Company)
DRUG (2001), Kenji Odajima
Hayazaki no Hana (2006), Maeda Sensei
Kamen Rider Kabuto: God Speed Love (2006 Toei), Sou Yaguruma aka Kamen Rider TheBee
AOGRA (2006, cinehouse), Kohiruimaki
Kamen Rider Den-O: I'm Born! (2007), Molech Imagin (voice)
Ai no Kotodama (2007, Frontie works), Ootani Shinya
Engine Sentai Go-onger: Boom Boom! Bang Bang! GekijōBang!! (2008), Hiroto Sutō/Go-on Gold
Kamen Rider Decade: All Riders vs. Dai-Shocker (2009 Toei), Kamen Rider KickHopper (voice)
BADBOYS (2011)
Thanatos (2011), Riku
An teru-san no hana (2012) 
Party wa sento kara hajimaru (2012), Hanashima
Engine Sentai Go-onger: 10 Years Grand Prix (2018), Hiroto Sutō/Go-On Gold

Anime
Gensoumaden Saiyuuki (2000), Tongpu

Original video
Gakkou Kaidan (Takahashi Yousuke) – Norowareta kioku (1998), Yamagishi Ryouichi

Stage
TOKYO JUNK CITY (2003, July – Shinjuku tiny alice)
Ashura no gotoku (2004, July – August, Geijutsu-za), Jinnai Hidemitsu
Knock Out Brother −2005version- (2005, October, Ikebukuro Theater green main hall)
Gekidan Daishuu shousetsuka (Jinsei Sairyou mitaina~!Hi?!~soushiki to kekkonshiki ga onaji hi ni?!~　(2007, April–May Tokyo geijutsu gekijyou）
Kuraku naru made matte, Wait Until Dark (September 2007), Carlino
10th anniversary project Masked Rider Live & Show 2009, (Kick Hopper voice)/ Singing "Rider Prision"

Radio
On the Way Comedy 道草 (2007, January, JFN)
CozyShell (moon size na Yaroudomo) (2000)

CM
Lotte black black gum (2006)
Lipton (2006–2007, Taiwan)

Books
Tokuyama Hidenori Sueter Book (2000) 
Tokuyama Hidenori MULTIPLE CHARACTER – photo book (2007)　
Hitotsu no kokoro no ikutsu ka no sakebi (2010)　
Tokuyama Hidenori shashin-shū little ゛ y ゛ ear (2012)

Discography

Singles
 "Afureru Omoi" (1999)
 Afureru Omoi
 Tsutaeru Kimochi
 Afureru Omoi (Instrumental)
 "huckleberry" (1999)
 huckleberry
 Touch Me
 huckleberry (Instrumental)
 "Close To Me" (2002)
 Close To Me
 Lover's Kitchen (Single Version)
 Close To Me (Instrumental)
 "FOR REAL" (2000)
 FOR REAL
 FOR REAL(Piano Version)
 FOR REAL(Guitar Version)
 FOR REAL(Instrumental)
 "STILL TIME" (2000)
 STILL TIME
 BLUE
 STILL TIME (Instrumental)
 "Sotsugyou" (2001)
 Sotsugyou
 That's a Fact
 Sotsugyou (Instrumental)
 "Propose / Ai no Mama Eien ni" (2011)
 Propose
 Ai no Mama Eien ni
 Propose(Instrumental)
 Ai no Mama Eien ni(Instrumental)
 "Sore wa Zenbu "Ai" Datta / I can't stop my heart" (2012)
 Sore wa Zenbu "Ai" Datta
 I can't stop my heart
 Sore wa Zenbu "Ai" Datta(Instrumental)
 I can't stop my heart(Instrumental)
 "Bokura no Michi / Ano Hi no Kimi ni" (2013)
 Bokura no Michi
 Ano Hi no Kimi ni
 Bokura no Michi(Instrumental)
 Ano Hi no Kimi ni(Instrumental)

Albums
 One 17th (2000)
 Spinning Wheel
 huckleberry　(Album Version)
 Tsutaeru Kimochi (Album Version)
 Lover's Kitchen
 Love Letter
 Close To Me
 No,Say Good－Bye
 Throw Away
 Sleepless Night
 Nichijyou
 Afureru Omoi (Album Version)		
 REAL TIME (2001)
 DRIVE
 FOR REAL
 BLUE（Album Version）
 PURE
 Kidukeyo
 STILL TIME
 Ha－Ha
 Sotsugyou
 Happy Birthday
 Itsumo sobani
 score BeAt (2007)
 WITH YOU!
 LIFE
 White night
 eve
 
 GIFT
 Silent Night
 
 miss you
 FakeRing
 puresoul (2012)
 everyday
 Take it easy
 Ai no Mama Eien ni
 I can't stop my heart
 Close to dream
 Sore wa Zenbu "Ai" Datta
 Break open
 Love is... feat.KoN
 Shunkashuto
 Purpose

eroica
 Knows the pain (2008)
 Dead or die
 Bounce High
 Ever free
 Reverberations
 Knows the pain
 Stray Child
 Sky Gravitation
 String
 No Way
 Future
 Half of one's body

In popular culture
 Close To Me (NTV Toriaezu iikanji Ending theme)
 FOR REAL (TBS Gensoumaden Saiyuuki Opening theme)
 STILL TIME (TBS Gensoumaden Saiyuuki Second opening theme)
 Sotsugyou (Asahi TV Tonight 2 Ending theme)
 Sotsugyou (TV Kanagawa (MutomaDI:GA, 2001, February, Opening and ending theme)
 LIFE (Ai no kotodama middle song)
 eve (Ai no kotodama theme song)

References

External links
 Official Blog (Ameblo)
 Official Website
 Official Blog (Yaplog)
 Interview on Cinematoday

1982 births
People from Suginami
Living people
Japanese male actors
Horikoshi High School alumni